The British Rail Class 800branded by Great Western Railway (GWR) as Intercity Express Train (IET), and London North Eastern Railway (LNER) as Azumais a type of bi-mode multiple unit train built by Hitachi Rail for  GWR and LNER. The type uses electric motors powered from overhead electric wires for traction, but also has diesel generators to enable trains to operate on unelectrified track. It is a part of the Hitachi AT300 product family.

The Class 800 was developed and produced, alongside an electric-only  variant, as part of the Intercity Express Programme (IEP) to procure replacements for the InterCity 125 and InterCity 225 fleets of high speed trains. The trains were manufactured by Hitachi between 2014 and 2018, being assembled at Hitachi's Newton Aycliffe Manufacturing Facility using bodyshells shipped from the company's Kasado Works in Japan.

The Class 800 trains came into service on the Great Western Main Line on 16 October 2017, while the first examples on the East Coast Main Line were put into service on 15 May 2019. Early operations have been troubled by fatigue cracking and corrosion on the aluminium vehicle body shells, particularly on the yaw dampers. Issues with overheating engines during summer months have also been reported.

Background and fleet summary

As part of the UK Government's Intercity Express Programme (IEP), the Class 800 units were built as partial replacements for the InterCity 125 trains which at the time operated services on the Great Western Main Line and the East Coast Main Line, as well as the InterCity 225 trains which currently operate services on the East Coast Main Line. The scheme drew heavily upon the preceding British Rail Class 395 high speed trains produced for Southeastern. A total of 80 train sets have been constructed, comprising 36 five-car and 21 nine-car units intended for operation with Great Western Railway (GWR), along with 10 five-car and 13 nine-car with London North Eastern Railway (LNER).

In March 2016, Virgin Trains East Coast announced that its trains would carry the brand name Azuma, the Japanese word for "East". During June 2016, GWR announced that its trains would be known as Intercity Express Trains. However, due to the early demise of Virgin Trains East Coast, they would not operate the new trains, which entered service with successor London North Eastern Railway. Even so, the Azuma brand has been retained by LNER.

In July 2016, it was revealed that GWR's intended fleet of  units were to be converted from pure EMU to bi-mode due to delays in the electrification. Subsequently, these were reclassified as Class 800/3. As a part of this reconfiguration, the original  fuel tanks were replaced with larger capacity  tanks.

Design
The Class 800 train is a high speed bi-modal multiple unit (BMU). The traction system comprises electric motors that are alternatively capable of drawing power from electrified overhead lines where available, or of using electricity produced by onboard underfloor diesel generators when travelling beyond the current electrified network. As per the train specification, the changeover between modes can occur at line speed for minimal service impact. As part of the Great Western Main Line order was originally for Class 801s, all Great Western franchise units have the possibility to be converted to electric-only operation by removal of the diesel engines.

Hitachi designed the rolling stock for conformance with the latest European standards as of 2014, including the Technical Specifications for Interoperability, and UK railway standards. Furthermore, a high level of flexibility was pursued as to allow the type to be operated on numerous lines with different infrastructure, both in the present and the foreseeable future, such as variable passenger demand and the rollout of electrification. The front end cars, which feature a collision safety structure compliant with the latest European standards, incorporate an automatic coupling system along with measures to reduce both air resistance and noise.

The driving cab of the Class 800 is provisioned with a variety of physical switches and monitors. The design of which was not only compliant with relevant standards at the time of design, but also shaped by feedback produced by drivers and “human-factor” experts to improve both ease-of-use and visibilities. The train crew are assisted by the Train Control and Management System (TCMS), which runs on an ethernet-based communication system. Amongst other functions, it provides onboard information systems such as the seat reservation system, public address, and passenger information system, as well interfacing with the cab displays, on-train data recorder, and 3G/4G communications.

It has been outfitted to work with various signalling systems, including the European Train Control System (ETCS) level 2, which satisfies safety integrity level 4 requirements. For compatibilities with legacy signalling systems, it is also provisioned with apparatus for the Train Protection & Warning System (TPWS), Automatic Warning System (AWS), and Automatic Train Protection (ATP) system. Train information can be shared between ETCS, TCMS, and the GSM-R wireless communication system to simplify data entry. The train communicates in realtime with wayside systems, transmitting from the data recorder and receiving timetables and seat allocation data, amongst other material. Location tracking via GPS is used to automatically control selective door operation (where stations are shorter than the trains), guide drivers in efficiently operate the train to best suit the route, and provide information to passengers.

The Class 800 is capable of driver-only operation when required, however, virtually all services have a guard on board, one exception being the Oxford and Bedwyn services operated by GWR, where drivers use the in-cab monitors to close the doors without a guard. When a guard is on board, door releases are still controlled by the driver, while the guard is responsible for closing the doors using the control panels in the vestibule areas; the driver will then carry out a secondary check of the side of the train before departure using the in-cab monitors.

Traction and generator units
Despite their underfloor positioning, the generator units (GU) feature a V12 engine. Incorporated as a single package, the GU includes the diesel engine, generator, radiator, and other subsystems, such as exhaust cleaning measures compliant with the Stage IIIB European Union exhaust emission standard. Elements external to the GU include the traction converter, fuel tank, automated fire protection system (using high pressure nitrogen gas), and braking. The auxiliary power system is powered directly from the direct current stage of the traction system. They are operated in parallel to provide greater redundancy. The power supply converter is designed to work with both sources of power, avoiding the need for a separate converter for each mode, thus reducing weight and complexity.

The GU is installed on vibration-isolating mountings, and fitted with side-mounted cowls to reduce external noise. Heat management measures include thermal insulation around key areas such as cable ducts. According to Modern Railways magazine, the limited space available for the GUs is responsible for them being prone to overheating. It claimed that, on one day in summer 2018, "half the diagrammed units were out of action as engines shut down through overheating".

The Class 800 and Class 802 bi-mode are equipped with three GU per five-car set and five GU per nine-car set; a five-car set has a GU situated under vehicles 2/3/4 and a nine-car set has a GU situated under vehicles 2/3/5/7/8. In comparison, the electric-orientated Class 801 features a single GU for a five to nine-car set, which provides emergency power for limited traction and auxiliaries if the power supply from the overhead line fails. By adding or removing GUs, a Class 800 can be converted into a Class 801 and vice versa.

Introduction into service

The Class 800 trains came into service on the Great Western Main Line on 16 October 2017, under the brand name Intercity Express Train (abbreviated to IET). Teething problems surfaced on the inaugural service, the train not only ran late but one of the carriages suffered an air conditioning unit failure that discharged water into the passenger area. Following further issues, the units were withdrawn from service on 19 October for the rest of the day, re-entering service during the next day.

At one point, the type were due to enter service on the East Coast Main Line from December 2018. The launching operator on the East Coast became London North Eastern Railway (LNER) following Virgin Trains' decision to return the franchise to the government; the introduction was postponed by six months on account of to the train's electro-magnetic emissions, which had reportedly caused problems with signals and other elements of lineside equipment.

On 30 June 2016, GWR's test unit (800004) ran from Reading to London Paddington carrying invited dignitaries.

On 14 June 2017, GWR unit 800003 was named Queen Elizabeth II by the monarch herself in a ceremony held at Paddington Station. The Queen had arrived at Paddington on the unit, travelling from Slough on the 175th anniversary of the first ever train journey by a reigning monarch, made on the same route by Queen Victoria. The name is carried in the form of a decal, rather than the more traditional cast metal plate; the name Queen Victoria is borne on the other end of the unit.

On 15 May 2019, the first Class 800 came into service on the East Coast Main Line under the brand name 'Azuma'. The type was initially worked on Leeds, Hull, and Newark services. On 1 August 2019, the first Class 800 performed the Edinburgh to King's Cross run on the Flying Scotsman service.

Named trains

Great Western Railway's Class 800 and 802 units are being named after "inspirational people" who have influenced the regions that the company serves.

London North Eastern Railway unveiled a special vinyl on one of their units to celebrate the launch of Azuma to Scotland. It was operated on the first Azuma from Scotland, which ran on the 'Flying Scotsman' from Edinburgh on 1 August 2019. This same unit was also used when Azuma was launched to Aberdeen and Inverness respectively.

On 10 January 2018, unit 800010 was named Michael Bond in a ceremony at Paddington by his daughter, Karen Jankel. This coincided with the 60th anniversary of the late author's famous Paddington Bear series of children's books, and the other end of the unit carries the bear's name.

On 1 May 2021, unit 800025 Captain Sir Tom Moore, arrived back at London Paddington, after completing a challenge to stop at 100 stations in only 40 hours, raising money for charity in memory of Captain Tom. The train was greeted by applause.

Liveries

Interiors

The passenger compartments on the Class 800 trains are typically divided into both first class and standard class sections. The vestibule area accommodates the exterior doors along with space for storage areas for passenger luggage (including bicycles, and a sizable universal accessibility toilet. It can be configured to include catering facilities, including a kitchen and preparation room. The interior was designed to fulfil the requirements of the Persons with Reduced Mobility-TSI standard, as well as to satisfy the varying requirements and preferences of multiple operators, and to facilitate future refurbishments and reconfigurations. The basic layout has been standardised.

The interiors have reportedly been praised for their increased leg-room and greater number of seats and tables in standard class, in comparison to the trains they replace. However, the seats in both standard and first class have been heavily criticised for excessive hardness and discomfort on lengthy journeys, with the overall first class experience said to be a downgrade as the seats are no longer leather like their predecessors had due to fire regulations. The GWR IET has also been criticised for the lack of a buffet car with the catering service instead being provided by a trolley and also the fact that surfboards are no longer allowed on the train due to the limited space available. In comparison with the IET, the LNER Azuma has a small 'micro' buffet retained with other aspects of the interior being similar between the two companies.

Accidents and incidents
 On the evening of 13 November 2019, an LNER Azuma (800109) was involved in a collision with a Class 43 HST powercar (43300) at Neville Hill Depot, Leeds when the Class 800 ran into the rear of the HST. On 18 November 2020, the Rail Accident Investigation Branch published its report into the accident with the investigation finding that driver error was the cause of the accident, with insufficient training of the driver being an underlying cause.
 On 26 April 2021 GWR temporarily withdrew eight 5-car Class 800 sets from service after finding cracks in the yaw damper brackets.
 On 8 May 2021, Great Western Railway, London North Eastern Railway and Hull Trains suspended most of their Class 800 series trains after cracks were found on the welds of the lifting pads on an IET trainset undergoing maintenance. This incident is potentially linked to the issues identified on a GWR trainset undergoing maintenance on April 26. Significant disruption was caused by cancellations of trains between London, to Scotland and to the west of the UK. Reports suggested that delays would last for "some time" with the repairs not being easy. From 13 May 2021, some trains started to return to service, however more severely affected trains require repairs before use and a long term fix for all units is required.

On 7 April 2022, the Office of Rail and Road (ORR), which regulates the safety and economics of Great Britain's railway, published a safety report on regarding the fatigue cracks in the aluminium vehicle body shells above the bogies close to the yaw damper bracket and anti-roll bar fixing points. The trains had experienced greater loads from train movement than specified, probably caused by a combination of wheel wear and track design. Further cracks in or near the welds of the lifting plates to the vehicle body were the result of stress corrosion cracking (SCC) in a high-strength 7000 series aluminium alloy caused by a combination of residual stresses from being MIG welded to the body and exposure to air containing sea salt on railway lines near the coast. To mitigate the risk of cracking, 1,247 Class 800 series vehicles need to be repaired by replacing the affected parts including the longitudinal welds and by installing additional bolts, to retain the plate, if the weld should fail completely as a result of stress corrosion cracking.

Models
In 2017, Hornby issued its first OO gauge five-car model of the BR Class 800/0 Hitachi IEP Bi-Mode in GWR Green livery.

In early May 2021, Kato released its N-scale five-car model of the BR Class 800/0 Hitachi IEP Bi-Mode in GWR Green livery with the five-car model of the BR Class 800/2 in LNER livery later that month.

Notes

References

External links

High-speed trains of the United Kingdom
Hitachi multiple units
Hybrid multiple units
Train-related introductions in 2017
25 kV AC multiple units